Vachaspati Mishra was a ninth or tenth century Indian Hindu philosopher of the Advaita Vedanta tradition, who wrote bhashya (commentaries) on key texts of almost every 9th-century school of Hindu philosophy. He also wrote an independent treatise on grammar, Tattvabindu, or Drop of Truth, which focuses on Mīmāṃsā theories of sentence meaning.

Biography
Vāchaspati Misra was born into a Maithil Brahmin family in Andhra Tharhi, Madhubani, Bihar. Little is known about Vāchaspati Miśra's life, and the earliest text that has been dated with certainty is from 840 CE, and he was at least one generation younger than Adi Śaṅkara. However, an alternate date for the same text may be 976 CE, according to some scholars; a confusion that is based on whether Hindu Śaka or Vikrama era  calendar is used for the dating purposes.

He was a student of Maṇḍana Miśra, who was his main inspirator. He harmonised Shankara's thought with that of Mandana Miśra. According to Advaita tradition, Shankara reincarnated as Vachaspati Miśra "to popularise the Advaita System through his Bhamati." 

He wrote so broadly on various branches of Indian philosophy that later Indian scholars called him the "one for whom all systems are his own", or in Sanskrit, a sarva-tantra-sva-tantra.

Bhamati school
The Bhamati school, named after Vāchaspati Miśra's commentary on Shankara's Brahma Sutra Bhashya, takes an ontological approach. It sees the Jiva as the source of avidya. It sees meditation as the main factor in the acquirement of liberation, while the study of the Vedas and reflection are additional factors.

Works

Bhāṣya
Vāchaspati Miśra was a prolific scholar and his writings are extensive, including bhasyas  (commentaries) on key texts of almost every 9th-century school of Hindu philosophy, with notes on non-Hindu or nāstika traditions such as Buddhism and Charvaka.

Vāchaspati Miśra wrote the Bhamati, a commentary on Shankara's Brahma Sutra Bhashya, and the Brahmatattva-samiksa, a commentary on Mandana Mishra's Brahma-siddhi. It is believed that the name of his most famous work "Bhāmatī" was inspired by his devout wife.

He wrote other influential commentaries, such as Tattvakaumudi on Sāṃkhyakārika; Nyāyasucinibandha on Nyāya-sūtras; Nyāyakānika (an Advaita work on science of reason), Tattvasamikṣa (lost work), Nyāya-vārttika-tātparyaṭīkā (a subcommentary on the Nyāya-sūtras), Tattva-vaiśāradī on Yogasūtra, and others.

While some known works of Vāchaspati Miśra are now lost, numerous others exist. Over ninety medieval era manuscripts, for example, in different parts of India have been found of his Tattvakaumudi, which literally means "Moonlight on the Truth". This suggests that his work was sought and influential. A critical edition of Tattvakaumudi was published by Srinivasan  in 1967.

Tattvabindu - theory of meaning
In Tattvabindu Vachaspati Mishra develops principles of hermeneutics, and discusses the "Theory of Meaning" for the Mīmāṃsā school of Hindu philosophy. This is an influential work, and attempted to resolve some of the interpretation disputes on classical Sanskrit texts. Vāchaspati examines five competing theories of linguistic meaning:
 Mandana Misra's (sphoṭavāda), which involves grasping the meaning of a word or sentence by perceiving a sphoṭa or single holistic sound, which is distinct from the elements (sounds or characters) that make up the word or sentence; 
 the Nyāya theory which involves concatenating the memory traces (saṃskāra) of momentary components of a word or sentence when we hear the final momentary component; 
 the similar Mīmāmsā theory, according to which our grasp of the meaning of a sentence lies in the memory traces created by the words; and
 the Prābhākara Mīmāmsā theory, anvitābhidhānavāda, "the view on which denotation is constituted by what is connected." On this view, sentence-meaning is derived from the meanings of its words, which is fully given only by syntactic relations with the other words — no sphoṭa or memory traces are required; and
 the Bhāṭṭa Mīmāṃsā theory, abhihitānvayavāda, or "the view on which connection (anvaya) is constituted by what has been denoted." On this view, word-meaning is denoted entirely first (abhihita) and then individual word-meanings are connected by means of lakṣaṇā (implication). Vāchaspati concurs with the Bhāṭṭa view, when he employs in other contexts, such as the Nyāya sub-commentary, the Nyāya-vārttika-tātparya-ṭīkā, and the Tattva-vaiśāradī.

References

Sources

 

 

 

 

 

 
 

Web-sources

Further reading
 S.S. Hasurkar, Vācaspati Miśra on Advaita Vedanta. Darbhanga: Mithila Institute of Post-Graduate Studies, 1958.
 Karl H. Potter, "Vācaspati Miśra" (in Robert L. Arrington [ed.]. A Companion to the Philosophers. Oxford: Blackwell, 2001. )
 J.N. Mohanty, Classican Indian Philosophy.  Oxford: Rowman & Littlefield, 2000. 
 V.N. Sheshagiri Rao, Vācaspati's Contribution to Advaita. Mysore: Samvit Publishers, 1984.

External links
 Bibliography of Vācaspati Mishra's works, Item 530, Karl Potter, University of Washington

10th-century Indian philosophers
Advaitin philosophers
Indian logicians
Indian Medieval linguists
Medieval Sanskrit grammarians
Nyaya
Philosophers of language
Philosophers of Mithila
Scholars from Bihar
Indian Sanskrit scholars